Mpumalanga is one of the nine multi-member constituencies of the National Assembly of South Africa, the lower house of the Parliament of South Africa, the national legislature of South Africa. The constituency was established as Eastern Transvaal in 1994 when the National Assembly was established by the Interim Constitution following the end of Apartheid. It was renamed Mpumalanga in 1999. It is conterminous with the province of Mpumalanga. The constituency currently elects 15 of the 400 members of the National Assembly using the closed party-list proportional representation electoral system. At the 2019 general election it had 1,951,776 registered electors.

Electoral system
Mpumalanga currently elects 15 of the 400 members of the National Assembly using the closed party-list proportional representation electoral system. Constituency seats are allocated using the largest remainder method with a Droop quota.

Election results

Summary

Detailed

2019
Results of the 2019 general election held on 8 May 2019:

The following candidates were elected:
Doris Eunice Dlakude (ANC), Sthembile Altia Hlongo (ANC), Angel Khanyile (DA), Lusizo Makhubela-Mashele (ANC), Valentia Thokozile Malinga (ANC), Vuyisile Promise Malomane (ANC), Reneiloe Mashabela (EFF), Timothy Victor Mashele (ANC), Thabile Sylvia Masondo (ANC), Elphus Fani Mathebula (ANC), Simanga Happy Mbuyane (ANC), Mbuyiseni Ndlozi (EFF), Elvis Kholwana Siwela (ANC), Gijimani Skosana (ANC) and Grace Kekulu Tseke (ANC).

2014
Results of the 2014 general election held on 7 May 2014:

The following candidates were elected:
Bongani Bongo (ANC), Mmatlala Grace Boroto (ANC), Sindisiwe Chikunga (ANC), Doris Eunice Dlakude (ANC), Dalton Hlamalani Khosa (ANC), Nicholous Pro Khoza (EFF), Henro Krüger (DA), Duduzile Promise Manana (ANC), Derick Mnguni (ANC), Nokhaya Adelaide Mnisi (ANC), Mogotle Friddah Nkadimeng (ANC), Hlakudi Frans Nkoana (ANC), Goodwill Sbusiso Radebe (ANC), Elvis Kholwana Siwela (ANC) and Gijimani Skosana (ANC).

2009
Results of the 2009 general election held on 22 April 2009:

The following candidates were elected:
Lourie Bosman (DA), Sindisiwe Chikunga (ANC), Christopher Lancaster Gololo (ANC), Eric Kholwane (ANC), Vuselelo Vincent Magagula (ANC), Mduduzi Comfort Manana (ANC), Buoang Lemias Mashile (ANC), Nokhaya Adelaide Mnisi (ANC), Dumisile Goodness Nhlengethwa (ANC), Mtombizodwa Florence Nyanda (ANC), Goodwill Sbusiso Radebe (ANC), Khellinah Nomvula Shoba (ANC), Gijimani Skosana (ANC), Grace Kekulu Tseke (ANC) and Adrian John Williams (ANC).

2004
Results of the 2004 general election held on 14 April 2004:

The following candidates were elected:
Sindisiwe Chikunga (ANC), Christopher Lancaster Gololo (ANC), Eric Kholwane (ANC), Zunaid Kotwal (ANC), Millicent Ntombizodwa Sibongile Manana (ANC), Piet Mohlamme Mathebe (ANC), Garth Piet Mngomezulu (ANC), Dumisile Goodness Nhlengethwa (ANC), Bongi Maria Ntuli (ANC), Priscilla Sindisiwe Sekgobela (ANC), Mtikeni Patrick Sibande (ANC), Jonas Ben Sibanyoni (ANC), Sipho Siboza (ANC) and Hilda Weber (DA).

1999
Results of the 1999 general election held on 2 June 1999:

1994
Results of the 1994 general election held on between 26 and 29 April 1994:

References

National Assembly constituency
National Assembly of South Africa constituencies
National Assembly of South Africa constituencies established in 1994